Eulima tenisoni is a species of sea snail, a marine gastropod mollusk in the family Eulimidae. The species is one of a number within the genus Eulima.

Distribution
This marine species is endemic to Australia and occurs off South Australia, Tasmania, Victoria and  Western Australia.

References

 Tryon, G.W. 1886. Manual of Conchology. Journal of the Academy of Natural Sciences of Philadelphia 1 8: 1-461, 79 pls
 Cotton, B.C. 1959. South Australian Mollusca. Archaeogastropoda. Handbook of the Flora and Fauna of South Australia. Adelaide : South Australian Government Printer 449 pp

External links
 To World Register of Marine Species

tenisoni
Gastropods of Australia
Gastropods described in 1886